Ora Haibe (27 September 1887 Guilford, Indiana – 10 December 1970 Fort Worth, Texas)  was an American racecar driver.

Indy 500 results

References 

1887 births
1970 deaths
Indianapolis 500 drivers
People from Dearborn County, Indiana
Racing drivers from Indiana